Kijiji.ca (village) is a Canadian online classified advertising website and part of eBay Classifieds Group, which was acquired by Adevinta in 2020. It operates sections for cities and urban regions, for posting local advertisements. Kijiji was launched in February 2005 as an eBay subsidiary and became part of the eBay Classifieds Group in 2007. The Kijiji brand is used in more than 100 cities in Canada and with kijiji.it in Italy, while eBay Classifieds websites are available under different brands in other countries. Kijiji parent is Dutch company Marktplaats BV since 2005, which is part of the same group.

Kijiji is the most popular online classifieds service in Canada and draws more traffic compared to competitor Craigslist in that country. The New York Times referred to Kijiji's Canadian site as representing "one of the few online brands that fizzled in the United States but found success elsewhere." Kijiji was made available to selected cities in the United States on June 29, 2007, however the brand was changed to eBay Classifieds in 2010.

Kijiji offers similar services and is seen as a competitor to Craigslist, with the biggest differences being that Kijiji has an extensive pets section, as well as a more modern interface.

History 

Kijiji was launched as "a start-up within eBay created by a small team of entrepreneurial employees", according to eBay's March 2005 press release announcing the new service. Kijiji was launched in February 2005 in Quebec City and Montreal, and expanded across the rest of Canada in November 2005.

In May 2005 eBay acquired the British-based online classifieds service Gumtree, which operates in cities in the United Kingdom, Ireland, Poland, Hong Kong, South Africa, Australia and New Zealand; as well as the Spanish company LoQUo. One month later it acquired OpusForum.org, a website offering online classifieds in Germany. In July 2006, Klaus Gapp, the founder of OpusForum, noted that after its acquisition it had "merged with its new Kijiji classifieds business in the German speaking markets of Austria, Germany and Switzerland."

In August 2008, Kijiji re-branded its India site to Quikr.

In 2009, the Kijiji Germany website changed its name to eBay Kleinanzeigen.

In February 2010, Kijiji withdrew its Personals section in the United States and Canada. In March 2010, eBay unveiled a new classifieds site, called eBay Classifieds, to replace Kijiji in the United States.

In November 2012, Kijiji entered into a listing partnership with Rentseeker.ca in Canada.

In April and May 2015, Kijiji Hong Kong and Kijiji Taiwan closed, with the homepages providing a list of links to other eBay-owned classifieds sites in other countries.

In June 2016, Kijiji introduced Admarkt, branded as Kijiji For Business. During this time, Kijiji put restrictions on the number of free ads users can have in certain categories. This was intended to push heavy users of the site to sign up for Admarkt.

In January 2017, Kijiji introduced eBay ads that appear in search results, which are identified by an eBay logo.

In July 2017, Kijiji made it mandatory to register with the site to post ads. Previously, registration had been optional.

In December 2017, Kijiji introduced “My Messages”, a messaging system which allows users to communicate with each other directly on the site.

By 2018, Kijiji was facing competition from social media sites such as Facebook Marketplace, and other classified ad sites such as VarageSale and LetGo.

In October 2018, Kijiji unveiled an updated logo, replacing the one that had been in use since the site started in 2005.

In November 2018, Kijiji launched Kijiji Autos, a new car shopping platform separate from the main site.

In July 2019, Kijiji announced the closure of the Tickets category, citing a shift from paper to digital tickets and the resulting problems with making sure the codes are authentic and functioning as the reason. Users were encouraged to buy and sell tickets on Kijiji’s partner StubHub, which is also owned by eBay. Kijiji disabled the option to post or repost ads in the Tickets category on July 29. By September 29, 2019, all Ticket ads expired and the category was closed.

In November 2019, Kijiji introduced the ability to leave user reviews.

In June 2020, Adevinta announced their intent to buy eBay Classifieds Group. The deal was completed on June 25, 2021.

On May 31, 2022 Kijiji.it shut down. It now directs users to try Subito.it

Legal conflict with Craigslist 
Kijiji's owner (eBay) was also a minority shareholder in Craigslist. In April 2008, eBay launched a lawsuit against Craigslist claiming that their executives were attempting to weaken eBay's investment, while in May of the same year, Craigslist filed a counter suit claiming Kijiji had stolen trade secrets and that eBay used misleading tactics to promote the service. To end the lawsuit, eBay agreed to sell back its 28.4% ownership stake in Craigslist in 2015.

References

External links 
 
 
 

EBay
Employment websites
Online marketplaces of Canada
Internet properties established in 2005